This article lists computer and video games in which a major part of the action takes place in New York City or a fictional city closely based on it.

List of games which feature New York City

List of games which feature a fictional city closely based on New York City
Ace Combat 6: Fires of Liberation (Xbox 360) is set in Gracemeria, based on New York City.
Batman: Arkham Knight (Windows, PS4, Xbox One) is set in Gotham City, which is roughly based on New York City: for example, it includes the Lady of Gotham which resembles the Statue of Liberty
Crazy Taxi 2 (Dreamcast) contains two cities, "Around Apple" and "Small Apple", which are both somewhat based on New York City. The latter is also included in Crazy Taxi 3: High Roller.
EarthBound (SNES) has a city called Fourside, which is also referred as the Big Banana; a parody of New York's nickname, the Big Apple.
While the final version of Final Fantasy VII (PlayStation) does not feature anything that resembles New York City specifically, the initial concept was supposed to take place in New York City, and the idea of a realistic setting stuck in the final game.
Final Fight (arcade) is set in a fictional city called Metro City, which features areas based on New York City.
Futurama (PS2, Xbox), which is set in "New New York"
Various games in the Grand Theft Auto series set in Liberty City, a New York City look-alike
Grand Theft Auto (PC, PS, GBC)
Grand Theft Auto III (Windows, PS2, Xbox)
Grand Theft Auto Advance (GBA)
Grand Theft Auto: San Andreas (Windows, PlayStation 2, Xbox), featured one mission in Liberty City
Grand Theft Auto: Liberty City Stories (PlayStation 2, PSP)
Grand Theft Auto IV (Windows, PS3, Xbox 360)
GTA IV: The Lost and Damned (Windows, Xbox 360, PS3)
GTA IV: The Ballad of Gay Tony (Windows, Xbox 360, PS3)
Grand Theft Auto: Chinatown Wars (Nintendo DS, PSP)
inFamous (PS3) is set in Empire City, based on New York City.
Kingpin: Life of Crime (Windows, Linux) is set in Radio City, a city that resembles New York City in the art-deco era
Mafia (Windows, PlayStation 2, Xbox), set in Lost Heaven, a representation of New York City and Chicago in the 1930s
Mafia II (Windows, PlayStation 3, Xbox 360), set in Empire Bay, a representation of New York City in the late 1940s
Mario Kart 8 (Wii U, Nintendo Switch) features the track "Toad Harbor", which closely resembles New York City.
Mother 3 (GBA) features a city known as New Pork City. This city is also featured as a stage in Super Smash Bros. Brawl.
Pokémon Black and White and its sequels (DS) are set in the Unova region, modeled after New York City.
The Sonic the Hedgehog series features many cities based on New York City.
Streets of Rage is set in an unnamed city based on New York City; many prominent New York City landmarks, such as the World Trade Center are visible throughout the game and on the European Mega Drive cover of Streets of Rage 3
Super Mario Odyssey (Nintendo Switch) features New Donk City that is based on New York, with a building resembling the Flatiron Building and a building resembling the Empire State Building as the city hall (called New Donk City Hall Plaza), and in the background a building resembling the Chrysler Building and a bridge resembling the Brooklyn Bridge. Like Fourside, it is called the Big Banana.

See also
Culture of New York City
Media in New York City

Other city video game lists
List of fiction set in Chicago
List of video games set in London

Video games
Video games
New York City